The Hanskühnenburg is a mountain hut in the Harz mountains. Its name comes from the legendary Hanskühnenburg Crag (Hanskühnenburg Klippe) 300 metres to the northwest, which was visited on 14 August 1784 by Johann Wolfgang von Goethe. Opposite the tower are the Hanskühnenburg Rocks (Hanskühnenburg Felsen) that are relatively small by comparison with the Klippe. A bronze plaque was mounted on these rocks in 1999 to commemorate Goethe's visit. In front of the Hanskühnenburg Rocks, a monument was erected in 1924 to Albert Leo Schlageter. It has since fallen over and is rather weathered.

History 
At the end of the 19th century, the Osterode branch of the Harz Club built the first wooden observation tower and a managed refuge hut on the thickly wooded Acker crest; the hut being opened in 1889. The tower proved unable to cope with the weather conditions and, by 1912, had become so damaged that it had to be torn down. One year later, the Hanover branch began the construction of a stone tower on the same spot; it was completed in 1914.

The First World War brought tourism to a standstill and the hut which was being managed as an inn, was closed, not least because it was a long way from any other settlements. In 1922, the guest house opened again until the Second World War broke out. 

In 1947, the hut, which had meanwhile become quite dilapidated, re-opened, but had to be closed again in 1957 when the hut and tower were placed out of bounds by the police due to their condition. In 1958 it had been refurbished sufficiently to enable the ban to be lifted again. but the fundamental overhaul that was really required was not carried out. In 1971 the damage to the Hanskühnenburg was once again so serious, that the structure was closed again. After emergency repairs the tower and hut re-opened in 1972.

The Harz Club did not have the necessary means to restore the structure and transferred ownership in 1974 to the district of Osterode, which took on the conversion and upgrade of the Hanskühnenburg. In 1975 this was completed at a cost of  500,000 DM and the operation of the hut started up again. 

Since the 1960s, the forest on the Acker crest has steadily retreated. At one time, the hut was hidden in thick forest; today, it is visible from a long way off. The tower offers a good all-round view over the mountains of the Upper Harz. It is also the only spot from where the two former centres of the Upper Harz mining industry, Clausthal and Sankt Andreasberg, can be seen at the same time.

Walking trails 
The Hanskühnenburg may be reached from all directions on numerous walking trails. There are longer walks from Osterode via the town forest (Stadtwald) and crest path (Kammweg) or along the Söse Reservoir. From Herzberg a path climbs from Lonau through the valleys of the Großer Lonau (metalled road) and the Sieber. The height difference is markedly less on the route from Riefensbeek-Kamschlacken to the hut. The easiest way to get to the hut, however, is from Stieglitzecke on the Harz High Road. Here there is a large car park and a bus stop. From the Stieglitzecke there are two routes to the Hanskühnenburg. The path on the eastern side is a wide walking track with only one steep section shortly before the hut. Considerably better views, especially in the morning, are offered by the path on the west side of the Acker. This path is however very hard going and rather boggy because the rain gutters have not been replaced for some time.

The tower is only accessible when the restaurant is open.

The Hahnskühnenburg is checkpoint no. 144 in the Harzer Wandernadel system, a popular network of walking trails.

References

External links 
 Short description of the hut and the legends about the crag

Harz
Rock formations of Lower Saxony